Karin Pettersson (born 14 January 1975 in Enskede, Stockholm) is a Swedish journalist. Since 2020, she is head of culture at Aftonbladet. From 2018 to 2019, she worked as director of public policy at the Schibsted Group. She was political editor-in-chief at Aftonbladet, between October 2010 and January 2018. She co-founded the magazine Fokus.

References 

Living people
1975 births
Writers from Stockholm
Swedish women journalists